TECOM Group, formerly known as TECOM Investments, is part of the UAE government-owned company, Dubai Holding.

History 
TECOM Group has been developing business districts and associated facilities in Dubai since 1999. The group has worked with the Dubai Government on Dubai Design District, Dubai Industrial City, Dubai Electricity and Water Authority,  Dubai Internet City, Dubai Industrial City, and Dubai Science Park. TECOM manages Dubai Internet City, Dubai Media City, Dubai Studio City and Dubai International Academic City. Dubai Design District (d3) is also a part of the group's themed developments portfolio, located adjacent to the Business Bay area. Emirates Towers District is the latest addition to the group's portfolio of business communities.

The group launched an innovation strategy worth AED 4.5 billion to create infrastructure and drive entrepreneurship. . This includes developing innovative parks, creative spaces, technology laboratories, smart buildings, launching new business incubators, and establishing a start-up fund to stimulate innovation. As part of this, the group launched a new platform for media start-ups and entrepreneurs, in5 Media. The group first invested in incubation and innovation centers in 2013, with in5 in Dubai Internet City, which has since worked with more than 20,000 people on hackathons, competitions and community events.

TECOM Group has collaborated with the UAE’s Ministry of Industry and Advanced Technology (MoIAT) to facilitate the country’s decarbonization efforts. It is also working on developing a freight terminal for the UAE’s national railway project, Etihad Rail. 

In February 2018, Malek Al Malek took over as Group CEO of TECOM Group, replacing Dr. Amina Al Rustamani. After the public listing, Al Malek was named Chairman of the Group.  Abdulla Belhoul is the current CEO of TECOM Group. 

In July 2022, TECOM Group commences trading on Dubai Financial Market(DFM) under the symbol TECOM.

Financial performance 
For the year 2022, Tecom Group has posted a net profit of AED 25.6 million.

References 

Property companies of the United Arab Emirates
Organisations based in Dubai
Companies based in Dubai
Business parks of the United Arab Emirates
Emirati companies established in 2005
Business services companies established in 2005